Shawal Anuar  (born 29 April 1991) is a Singaporean professional footballer who mainly plays as a forward for Singapore Premier League club Lion City Sailors and the Singapore national team. Considered as one of the best players in the league, Shawal is known for his dribbling skills, speed and finishing.

Club career

Geylang International
Shawal began his professional football career with Geylang International in the S.league in 2014, having previously only played with  ,NFL side Keppel Monaco FC in the NFL. Despite being signed for the team's reserve Prime League side, Shawal managed to appear for the senior team, clocking in 69 minutes of football for the senior side. 

He was handed an extension to his contract and had a solid full debut season for the Eagles in 2015, scoring 4 goals in 22 appearances, helping his team finish 8th in the league. 

Shawal built on his debut season and helped his team win the 2016 Singapore League Cup Plate, Geylang's first trophy since 2009, while earning a call-up to the national team. His performances in 2016 prompted his head coach Hasrin Jailani to identify him as one of the players to watch for in the 2017 S.League season. 

Shawal started the 2017 season on a good note. Following Geylang International and Matsumoto Yamaga signing of a MOU in November 2016, Shawal, together with fellow winger Gabriel Quak, were selected to go on a one-week trial with the J2 side. Both players were not offered a contract, with the Japanese side saying that the pair was good enough to play in the J3 League with potential to feature in the top-tier J.League if they fulfill their potential. Shawal started in the season open against Hougang United and scored his first goal of the season in the following match, helping his team to 3 points over Balestier Khalsa. He got his second of the season in a 2-0 win over the Garena Young Lions in Geylang's 5th game of the season.

As of the end of the 2018 Singapore Premier League season, Shawal has notched 22 goals in 77 appearances for the Eagles.

Hougang United FC
After scoring 9 goals over 16 appearances with Geylang International in the 2019 Singapore Premier League, Shawal was snapped up by the Cheetahs for the 2020 Singapore Premier League season on a 2 year contract. 

Shawal ended his career at Hougang with 14 goals and 10 assists, helping them win their first ever silverware in the form of the Singapore Cup, in 2022.

Lion City Sailors 
Shawal was unveiled officially as part of the Lion City Sailors squad on 21 December 2022, ahead of the 2023 Singapore Premier League season.

Career statistics

Club
. Caps and goals may not be correct.

International career
Shawal was called up for the first time to the senior team by Singapore's head coach V. Sundramoorthy in 2016 for matches against Malaysia and Hong Kong. He made his international debut against Hong Kong in the 79th minute, replacing Gabriel Quak.

Shawal scored his first international goal, in his second international cap, against Afghanistan. He scored in the 46th minute to equalise for the Lions. However, Singapore fell to an eventual 2-1 defeat. He scored his third and fourth international goal in a 3-1 win over Maldives in a final friendly game ahead of the 2022 AFF Championship. Shawal then scored his fifth international goal in his next game, coolly slotting in a 74th-minute winner, from a Zaiful Nizam long punt, to help the Lions to win their 2022 AFF Championship opening game against Myanmar. He notched his sixth goal in Singapore's 2-0 win over Laos in the 2022 AFF Championship, nicking the ball from Laos goalkeeper Keo-Oudone Souvannasangso in the 94th minute of the game.

International caps

International goals

References

External links
https://web.archive.org/web/20161115182849/http://www.fas.org.sg/news/irfan-follows-his-fathers-footsteps-make-lions-debut
https://web.archive.org/web/20161127022049/http://www.fas.org.sg/news/shawal-irfan-determined-show-what-they-can-d

1991 births
Living people
Singapore international footballers
Singaporean footballers
Geylang International FC players
Singapore Premier League players
Singaporean people of Malay descent
Association football forwards